Michal Polák, Michel Polak or Michael Polák may refer to:

 , Czech musician (born 1944)
 Michal Polák (programmer) (aka Michael Polák), Czech computer programmer and musician (born 1973), developer of the Arachne web browser
  (1885-1948), Swiss-Belgian architect
 Michal Polák (ice hockey), Czech ice hockeyist (born 1985)
 Michal Polák (photographer), Czech photographer (born 1987)
 Michal Polák (football), Slovak football player (FK Lokomotíva Devínska Nová Ves)
 , Slovak journalist, intellectual, philosopher and economist

See also
  (born 1979)
 Polák
 Michal (disambiguation)